Napaskiak Airport  is a state-owned, public-use airport located one nautical mile (1.85 km) southwest of the central business district of Napaskiak, a city in the Bethel Census Area of the U.S. state of Alaska.

As per Federal Aviation Administration records, Napaskiak Airport had 1,321 passenger boardings (enplanements) in calendar year 2008, a decrease of 28.9% from the 1,858 enplanements in 2007. This airport is included in the FAA's National Plan of Integrated Airport Systems (2009–2013), which categorizes it as a general aviation facility.

Facilities 
Napaskiak Airport has one runway designated 2/20 with a gravel surface measuring 3,000 by 60 feet (914 x 18 m). It also has a seaplane waterway on the Kuskokwim River which is designated 9W/27W and measures 15,000 by 2,000 feet (4,572 x 610 m). The airport is unattended.

References

External links 
 FAA Alaska airport diagram (GIF)
 
 Resources for this airport:
 
 
 

Airports in the Bethel Census Area, Alaska
Seaplane bases in Alaska